Miguel Porteous  (born 14 May 1999) is a New Zealand freestyle skier who competes internationally.
 
He represented New Zealand in the 2018 Winter Olympics, where he finished 17th in the men's ski halfpipe and the 2022 Winter Olympics where he made it to the final of the men's ski halfpipe.

Winter X Games XXI
Miguel took home the silver medal during the 2017 Winter X Games which were held in Aspen, Colorado. He had a score of 81.00 points and skied wearing a cast due to a broken wrist.

Porteous is the older brother of freestyle skier Nico Porteous.

References

External links

1999 births
Living people
New Zealand male freestyle skiers
Olympic freestyle skiers of New Zealand
Freestyle skiers at the 2018 Winter Olympics
Freestyle skiers at the 2022 Winter Olympics
People educated at Te Aho o Te Kura Pounamu
Sportspeople from Hamilton, New Zealand